Jacksonburg is a census-designated place (CDP) in Wetzel County, West Virginia, United States. It lies at an elevation of 748 feet (228 m). As of the 2010 census, its population was 182.

References

Census-designated places in Wetzel County, West Virginia
Census-designated places in West Virginia